Pingdingshan West railway station is a railway station on the border of Baofeng County and Xinhua District, Pingdingshan, Henan, China. It opened with the first stage of the Zhengzhou–Wanzhou high-speed railway on 1 December 2019.

The name Pingdingshan West was used by another station, however, this station had its name changed to Baofeng railway station in July 2019.

References

Railway stations in Henan
Railway stations in China opened in 2019